Zarechnaya is a village in , Permsky District, Perm Krai, Russia. The population was 75 as of 2010.

Geography 
It is located 3 km west from Gamovo.

References 

Rural localities in Permsky District